Gerard (died 1216), Count of  Rieneck, son of Gerard, Count of Loon, and Adelaide of Gelderland, daughter of Henry I, Count of Guelders, and Agnes of Arnstein, daughter of Louis III of Arnstein.

Virtually nothing is known about his life other than his children who succeeded their uncles as Counts of Looz.

Gerard married Cunegonde von Zimmern, daughter of Sibodo III, Count of Zimmern.  Gerard and Cunegonde had five children:
 Louis III, Count of Looz and Count of Rieneck
 Arnold IV, Count of Looz and Count of Chiny
 Gerard (d. before 1272)
 Berthold, Canon in Würzburg
 Imagina, married to Goswin III, Herr von Born.

Gerard was succeeded as Count of Rieneck by his brother Arnold, but the county went eventually to his son Louis, and his descendants. The county of Loon eventually went to his younger son Arnold and his descendants.

Sources 

Baerten, J., "Les origines des comtes de Looz et la formation territoriale du comté", Revue belge de philologie et d'histoire 43 (2), 1965

Medieval Lands Project, Comtes de Looz

Counts
1216 deaths